China Clipper is a 1936 drama film directed by Ray Enright, written by Frank Wead and starring Pat O'Brien, Ross Alexander, Beverly Roberts, Humphrey Bogart and, in his final motion-picture appearance, veteran actor Henry B. Walthall. Walthall was gravely ill during production and his illness was incorporated into his character's role. He died during production.

The film was produced by First National Pictures and distributed by its parent company Warner Bros.

Plot
In the mid-1930s, Dave Logan is struggling to build and fly a new ocean-going flying boat with the goal of reaching China from San Francisco. His wife Jean and his boss Jim Horn try to discourage him, but he enlists his World War I pilot buddy Tom Collins and aircraft designer "Dad" Brunn, to start an airline flying between Philadelphia and Washington, D.C.

Undeterred when the airline fails, the group start a second airline in Key West, Florida to deliver mail throughout the Caribbean. Another pilot friend, Hap Stuart, joins as the airline begins to prosper. Logan becomes more obsessed, making life difficult for all around him, including his wife and best friends. Jean and Hap quit but return on the eve of an important proving flight.

The new China Clipper is the last project for Dad, who succumbs to heart disease shortly after the takeoff. When the China Clipper encounters a severe Typhoon off the China coast, Logan decides he must cancel the history-making flight, but Hap lands the big flying boat safely with several minutes to spare, winning a most important aviation contract. This secures the future for Dave logan's vision of the first worldwide international airline.

Cast

Pat O'Brien as Dave Logan
Beverly Roberts as Jean "Skippy" Logan
Ross Alexander as Tom Collins
Humphrey Bogart as Hap Stuart
Marie Wilson as Sunny Avery
Joseph Crehan as Jim Horn
Addison Richards as Mr. B.C. Hill
Ruth Robinson as Mother Brunn
Henry B. Walthall as "Dad" Brunn
Carlyle Moore Jr. as Clipper Radio Operator
Lyle Moraine as Clipper Co-Pilot
Dennis Moore as Clipper Engineer
Wayne Morris as Clipper Navigator
Alexander Cross as Bill Andrews
William Wright as Pilot Who Won't Fly
Kenneth Harlan as Commerce Inspector
Anne Nagel as Logan's Receptionist
Marjorie Weaver as Logan's Secretary
Milburn Stone as Radio Operator
Houseley Stevenson as Doctor (uncredited)

Production

Screenwriter Frank "Spig" Wead wrote the film as a thinly disguised biography of aviation pioneer Juan Trippe, especially Trippe's life around the period of the founding of Pan American Airways. Filmed with the cooperation of Pan Am, actual newsreel and production footage of the Martin M-130 is used throughout the film to emphasize the story just as it was happening for Trippe in real life. Aviation film historian Mark Carlson described China Clipper as a "veiled advertisement for what was once one of the greatest airlines in the world."

The flying sequences in China Clipper were filmed with famed Hollywood stunt pilot Paul Mantz, who worked with veterans Elmer Dyer and H. F. Koenekamp to create realistic aerial photography. Some scenes depict the aircraft flying over the incomplete San Francisco-Oakland Bay Bridge while it was still under construction.

The aircraft used in China Clipper are:
 Martin M-130 c/n 558, NC14716 
 Lockheed Vega5C c/n 100, NC48M 
 Fokker F-10A c/n 1042, NC582K 
 Douglas Dolphin1 Special c/n 999, NC967Y 
 Consolidated Model 16 Commodore
 Sikorsky S-40 
 Sikorsky S-42 Clipper 
 Ford Trimotor4 ATE
 Keystone LB-7
 Keystone B-4A

Reception
Despite Warner Bros.' typical casting and plot, China Clipper was well received, as its packaging did not detract from the timely account of a transpacific flight. In his review for The New York Times, Frank S. Nugent commented: "A fascinating and surprisingly literal dramatization of the China Clipper's transpacific flight of last November, the picture deserves a respectful accolade both for its technical accuracy and for its rather astonishing refusal to describe the flying boat's journey in the stock terms of aerial melodrama."

References

Notes

Citations

Bibliography

 Carlson, Mark. Flying on Film: A Century of Aviation in the Movies, 1912–2012. Duncan, Oklahoma: BearManor Media, 2012. .
 Halliwell, Leslie. Leslie Halliwell's Film Guide. New York: Harper & Roe, 1989. .
 Yenne, Bill. Seaplanes & Flying Boats: A Timeless Collection from Aviation's Golden Age. New York: BCL Press, 2003. .

External links
 
 
 
 
 China Clipper lobby posters

1936 films
Films set in the 1930s
Films directed by Ray Enright
American aviation films
Films produced by Samuel Bischoff
First National Pictures films
Films scored by Heinz Roemheld
American black-and-white films
American drama films
1936 drama films
1930s English-language films
1930s American films
Films scored by Bernhard Kaun